Ole Hammarlund is a Canadian politician, who was elected to the Legislative Assembly of Prince Edward Island in the 2019 Prince Edward Island general election. He represents the district of Charlottetown-Brighton as a member of the Green Party of Prince Edward Island.

Early life and career

Born and raised in Denmark, Hammarlund studied architecture at the Massachusetts Institute of Technology, and moved to Prince Edward Island in 1977 after being commissioned to design The Ark, an experimental sustainable housing project in Spry Point.

Political career
In 2019, he was elected as MLA for Charlottetown-Brighton, he served as opposition critic for Transportation and Infrastructure. On March 6, 2023, he lost the Green nomination to Janice Harper, for his district.

Election results

References 

Living people
People from Charlottetown
Canadian architects
Green Party of Prince Edward Island MLAs
Danish emigrants to Canada
21st-century Canadian politicians
Year of birth missing (living people)
MIT School of Architecture and Planning alumni